The 17th Antiaircraft Artillery Battalion (17th AAA Bn) was an antiaircraft unit in the United States Marine Corps that served during World War II.  The battalion was originally formed in 1942 as the 2d Airdrome Battalion and has the distinction of being the last defense battalion formed in the Marine Corps during the war.  Its original mission was to provide air and coastal defense for advanced naval bases.  During the war the battalion spent significant time defending Nukufetau and took part in combat operations at Tarawa and Tinian.  The battalion was decommissioned on December 6, 1945.

History

Organization

The 2d Airdrome Battalion was commissioned on October 28, 1942 at Camp Linda Vista, San Diego, California. It was one of two airdrome battalions formed by the Marine Corps specifically to defend airfields in the China Burma India Theater. Those airfields were overrun by the Japanese before the battalions deployed so the Marine Corps quickly changed their tasking to missions in the Pacific Theater.  
 
The first thirteen men in the battalion came over from the 12th Defense Battalion joining the newly formed Headquarters and Service Battery under the authority of Area General Order 15-42. While organizing and training in Southern California the battalion spent extensive time at Camp Callan, near La Jolla and Camp Dunlap in the Imperial Valley. The 2d Airdrome Battalion departed the United States near the end of May 1943 onboard the USS Henderson (AP-1) and SS Cape Clear (AK-5039).

The battalion arrived in Oahu, Hawaii on May 31, 1943.  The battalion remained there for ten weeks of additional training as it waited for initial deployment orders.  On August 14, 1943 the battalion embarked on the USS Ormsby (APA-49) and the SS Whistler and sailed west for the Ellice Islands.

Nukefetau and Tarawa

Arriving at Funafuti on August 21, the 2d Airdrome Battalion only stayed a few days before moving to Nukufetau on August 25, 1943 along with the first elements of the Navy's 16th Naval Construction Battalion.   Nukufetau was a small atoll 75 miles northwest of the airfield that had been established on Funafuti.  The battalion was responsible for air defense of the area while the Seabees constructed Nukufetau Airfield.  The airfield was opened on October 6, 1943.

Half of the 2d Airdrome Battalion was detached from duty on Nukufetau and sailed for Tarawa.  The detachment went ashore four days after the 2nd Marine Division assaulted the beaches. The remainder of the battalion departed Nukufetau in March 1944 after being relieved by elements of the 51st Defense Battalion.  The 2d Airdrome Battalion sailed for Hawaii landing at Nawiliwili Harbor on March 21, 1944.

Reorganization and Tinian
The 2d Airdrome Battalion was redesignated as the 17th Defense Battalion on March 22, 1944 and assigned to the V Amphibious Corps.  On April 19, 1944 it was again re-designated as the 17th Antiaircraft Battalion.  In Hawaii they trained for the occupation and defense of small islands in the Pacific. Between June 10–18 the battalion departed Hawaii in three echelons. The unit spent the next 54 days at sea en route to their final objective.  While anchored in the harbor at Eniwetok on July 19 the battalion's moniker was changed for the final time, this time to the 17th Antiaircraft Artillery Battalion.

The 17th Defense Battalion landed on Tinian on August 2, 1944.  The battalion immediately established anti-aircraft positions north of the airfield and in the harbor.  The battalion remained on occupation duty on Tinian for the next year.  During these months they conducted routine patrols and took a number of Japanese prisoners of war still on the island after the battle. Three Japanese aircraft bombed and strafed the island on November 3, 1944 however the battalion's batteries were not able to successfully engage any of the aircraft.  The battalion was guarding the airfield on August 6, 1945 when the Enola Gay launched to drop the first ever nuclear weapon against Hiroshima in mainland Japan.  On August 15, 1945 the 17th Antiaircraft Artillery Battalion was relieved of its tactical duties on Tinian.  It finally departed the island on November 1, 1945 on the USS Griggs (APA-110).   The battalion sailed back to the United States and was officially decommissioned on December 6, 1945 at Marine Corps Base Camp Pendleton, California.

Gallery

Unit awards 
A unit citation or commendation is an award bestowed upon an organization for the action cited. Members of the unit who participated in said actions are allowed to wear on their uniforms the awarded unit citation. The 17th Antiaircraft Artillery Battalion has been presented with the following awards:

See also
Marine Defense Battalions
List of United States Marine Corps aviation support units

Citations

References
Bibliography

 
 

Journal

Web
 Part 2

Further reading
 Henry Jr., Charles E. (1971)  One Of A Kind: 2d Airdrome Battalion Fleet Marine Force United States Marine Corps Mercury Printing Company  

AAA17
Military units and formations established in 1942
AAA
Military units and formations of the United States Marine Corps in World War II